Katha Nayagan may refer to:

 Katha Nayagan (1988 film), a Tamil-language film directed by Muktha Srinivasan, starring Pandiarajan and Rekha
 Katha Nayagan (1997 film), a Malayalam-language film directed by Rajasenan, starring Jayaram and Divya Unni
 Katha Nayagan (2017 film), an Indian Tamil romantic comedy film